"Mr Medicine" is the fourth single from British recording artist Eliza Doolittle, taken from her debut album Eliza Doolittle. It was released on 7 March 2011 and peaked at 130.

Promotion
On 22 March 2011 Eliza performed the song on The Alan Titchmarsh Show. On 23 March 2011 she performed the song on Daybreak. She then performed the song on Fern on 4 April 2011. She also Performed on Brazilian late night show "Altas Horas" on 16 October 2011.

Music video
The music video for the song appeared on Doolittle's YouTube channel on 11 February 2011.

In the video, Eliza comes to a restaurant, which is poised to play the music (her own) Go Home. As she leaves, the song "Mr. Medicine" starts to play and Eliza is followed by a monster. She is walking and singing on her way home. More and more monsters appear and start to dance. When Eliza comes home she slams the door behind her, locking the arm of one of the monsters. The monster gets the arm and walks away with the others, in a row.

Credits and personnel
Lead vocals – Eliza Doolittle
Producers – Steve Chrisanthou
Lyrics –  John Beck, Steve Chrisanthou, Eliza Doolittle
Label: Parlophone

Track listings
Digital download

Chart performance

References

Eliza Doolittle (singer) songs
Parlophone singles
Songs written by Eliza Doolittle (singer)
Songs written by John Beck (songwriter)
Songs written by Steve Chrisanthou
2011 singles
2011 songs